Mad Cows and Englishmen is the sixth and last studio solo album by Captain Sensible, released in 1996 by Scratch Records.

Critical reception 

In his review of the album on the music website Brainwashed, Mark Weddle wrote: "Captain's psychedelic tinged power pop cranks up the guitar and carries on where the Damned left off in the early 80's around the time of Strawberries." Weddle called the songs "well written and executed", stating "Of Sensible's half dozen or so solo albums to date, this one is his best".

Reissues 

Mad Cows and Englishmen was reissued through Empty Records in 1997 and The Store For Music in 2001, adding live recordings of "Wot" and "Happy Talk" as bonus tracks. The hidden track, "Cigarette Sandy", was not included on the reissues. In 1998, Eagle Records reissued the album as The Masters, including "Cigarette Sandy" and the two bonus tracks.

Track listing 

Notes

At 6:25 of track 11 there is 20 seconds of silence before the beginning of "Cigarette Sandy", a song which is shown as track 12 on the lyric sheet but not listed on the album sleeve.  
"Cigarette Sandy" is not included on the 1997 and 2001 reissues of Mad Cows and Englishmen. 
"Neverland" was rerecorded by the Damned in 2001 on Grave Disorder.

The Masters (1998 reissue)

Personnel 
Credits adapted from the album's liner notes.

Musicians
Captain Sensible - vocals, guitar
Monty Oxymoron - organ, synthesizer, drums ("Monty's Revenge") 
Sir Dangerous Dave - bass
Garrie Dreadful - drums
Additional musicians
Jennie Cruse  - vocals 
Rachel Bor - vocals 
Sarah Mölz - additional vocals ("Monty's Revenge")
Technical
Nick Smith - producer, engineer
John Boy - live sound recording
Brian Adams - executive producer
Georgie Best - artwork
pre-production at Schweine Sound Studios, Lucerne

References 

1996 albums
Captain Sensible albums